"Seein' Red" is a song recorded by American country music artist Dustin Lynch. It was released to country radio on July 11, 2016 as the lead single from his third studio album Current Mood (2017). The song was written by Kurt Allison, Steve Bogard, Tully Kennedy and Jason Sever. "Seein' Red" gave Lynch his fourth consecutive number-one hit on the Country Airplay chart. It also reached numbers five and 55 on both the Hot Country Songs and Hot 100 charts respectively. It was certified Gold by the Recording Industry Association of America (RIAA), denoting sales of over 500,000 copies in the country. The song achieved similar success in Canada, peaking at number four on the Country chart. It received a Gold certification from Music Canada, denoting sales of over 40,000 units in that country. The accompanying music video for the song, directed by Adam Rothlein, is loosely based on the Foo Fighters' 2007 video for "The Pretender".

Commercial performance
"Seein' Red" reached number one on the Billboard Country Airplay chart in February 2017, making this Lynch's fourth consecutive number one on this chart. It debuted at number 79 on the Hot 100 the week of January 14. Four weeks later, it peaked at number 55 the week of February 11, staying on the chart for nine weeks. The song has sold 213,000 copies in the US as of March 2017. It was certified gold by the RIAA in the US on July 14, 2017 for 500,000 units in sales and streams. In Canada, it peaked at number four on the Country chart the week of February 10, and stayed on the chart for twenty-one weeks.

Music video
The music video was directed by Adam Rothlein and premiered on The Country Network, CMT, GAC and Vevo in November 2016. It is loosely based on the 2007 video for "The Pretender" by Foo Fighters, and features Lynch and his band playing in an all-white room in front of a big red screen. The screen shows black-and-white footage of a woman with red lips and red heels, made to look as if Lynch was imagining the scenes. Right as the last chorus hits, just like in the Foo Fighters video, the screen explodes right in the band's direction, and engulfs the band and Lynch in red powder. The video ends with Lynch and the band finishing the song messy, but unscathed. Scenes featuring Dustin and the woman making out in a bed were also filmed, but eventually cut from the final video.

Live performance
On July 6, 2016, Lynch first performed the song live on Conan.

Charts

Weekly charts

Year-end charts

Certifications

References

2016 songs
2016 singles
Dustin Lynch songs
BBR Music Group singles
Songs written by Steve Bogard